"A Transfer", known by the Japanese title  is the third episode of the anime Neon Genesis Evangelion, created by Gainax. Series director Hideaki Anno and writer Akio Satsukawa wrote the episode, directed by Hiroyuki Ishido. It aired originally on TV Tokyo on October 18, 1995. The series is set fifteen years after a worldwide cataclysm named Second Impact, particularly in the futuristic fortified city of Tokyo-3. The protagonist is Shinji Ikari, a teenage boy whose father, Gendo, recruited him to the organization Nerv to pilot a giant bio-machine mecha named Evangelion into combat with beings called Angels. In the episode, Shinji begins attending his new school in Tokyo-3 and has a difficult time dealing with the fame of being an Evangelion pilot. His classmate Toji Suzuhara, whose little sister was injured in Shinji's fight against the Angel Sachiel shown in the previous episode, is angry at him; a new Angel named Shamshel appears, and Shinji must once again pilot Eva-01 to defeat it.

Production for "A Transfer" began after the fifth and sixth episodes. The episode analyzes the characters' relationships and Shinji's psyche in particular. "A Transfer" scored a 7.1% rating of audience share on Japanese TV and received a divided reception. Critics praised the animation, sound, and character focus, while others criticized Toji's characterization and Shinji's actions.

Plot
Shinji Ikari tries to adjust to his new life in Tokyo-3. He is now the official pilot of the giant mecha Evangelion 01 for the special agency Nerv and lives with Nerv's captain Misato Katsuragi, though their relationship is still distant. As the episode opens, he is lethargically going through the motions of training. In the morning he departs for school; Nerv's Dr. Ritsuko Akagi calls Misato to check on Shinji and is told that Shinji seems to have made no friends at school. There, Shinji's classmates Kensuke Aida, Toji Suzuhara, and Hikari Horaki are first introduced. They begin to discuss the battle between a mecha and an enemy named Sachiel, the third of a series of beings called Angels, which took place in the previous episode. Toji has only just returned to class for the first time since the fight, explaining that he had to care for his sister, who was injured in the battle with Sachiel. When Shinji's classmates discover his identity as a pilot, Toji, who blames him for his sister's injuries, gives him a beating in retaliation, and Shinji's protestations that he was piloting involuntarily make Toji angrier.

The fourth Angel, Shamshel, attacks Tokyo-3 and Shinji is mobilized in Eva-01 to defend the city. Kensuke convinces Toji to sneak out of their shelter to watch the battle from nearby. Shinji loses his nerve to fight and is tossed into the air by Shamshel, almost killing Toji and Kensuke as he lands. This also severs Eva-01's Umbilical Cable, leaving it with just five minutes of reserve power. Shinji then begins fighting a defensive battle, attempting to protect Toji and Kensuke rather than defeat the Angel. To protect them from the battle, Misato orders Toji and Kensuke to take refuge in the Evangelion's cockpit. Inside, Toji sees Shinji's great anguish and pain as he fights the Angel, and is beset by remorse. Misato orders Shinji to retreat, but he loses his temper and charges Shamshel with his knife, defeating the Angel as its power runs out. Days later, Kensuke gives Toji the number of Shinji's phone so he can apologize; Toji attempts to call but stops.

Production
Neon Genesis Evangelion director Hideaki Anno and Akio Satsukawa wrote the script for "A Transfer". Assistant director Kazuya Tsurumaki and Hiroyuki Ishido composed the storyboards. Ishido also served as director, while Nobuhiro Hosoi took the role of chief animator, and Tsurumaki and Yoshitoh Asari served as assistant character designers. Animator Yō Yoshinari also contributed to the depiction of the battle against Eva-01 and the Angel Shamshel. The staff initially called the episode . After the battle with the Angel, Shinji would have become friends with Toji and Kensuke, receiving a call from them; the staff, however, changed the planned scenario and moved the beginning of the friendship to the following episode, "Hedgehog's Dilemma". The title was later changed to "The Silent Phone", with the English title "A Transfer". According to the schedule, Anno had already worked on the fifth and sixth episodes of the series at the time. He felt he had to go beyond regular anime in developing realistic characters for "A Transfer" and "Hedgehog's Dilemma", so he tried to focus on Shinji's relationships in the installments.

For writer Dani Cavallaro, the first scene, in which Shinji engages in a simulation with a virtual image of the Angel Sachiel intended to refine his skills, is a "characteristic example of Evangelions self-referential use of computer technology, insofar as the video game-style images of the Eva-01 of Sachiel employed by the Nerv personnel in the exercise are indeed computer-generated to a substantial extent". Specific technical terminology was used for the simulated battle, including terms such as "gain" and "induction mode". In the episode, an image of a crater generated by the battle in the previous episode, "The Beast", was introduced, in which a mountain named Mount Takanosu was depicted. Tokyo-3 is also shown in a battle for the first time in "A Transfer"; for the landscapes of the city, Anno took inspiration from Tracy Island from the Thunderbirds series and the headquarters of UFOs SHADO organization. An imperfect three-dimensional representation of the Entry Plug was also added at the end of the episode, produced by Kensuke on his laptop according to his memories.

Several voice actors were used again to portray Shinji's classmates in the installment; the female companions, in particular, are voiced by Yūko Miyamura, Kotono Mitsuishi, and Megumi Hayashibara, who also voices the characters of Asuka Langley Soryu, Misato Katsuragi, and Rei Ayanami. At the beginning of the episode, a radio program with two female speakers talking about Matsuzaki city was included, revealing details about the geography of the world of Evangelion in "A Transfer". Junko Iwao and Yūko Miyamura voiced the two female speakers of the radio program. Eiji Maruyama, who worked on Mirai Keisatsu Urashiman and other anime series, also voiced Shinji's math teacher. British singer Claire Littley sang a cover of "Fly Me to the Moon" which was later used as the episode's closing theme song, replaced in late home video editions by another cover by Yoko Takahashi.

Cultural references and themes 

The key theme of "A Transfer" and the following episode, "Hedgehog's Dilemma", is interpersonal communication. "A Transfer" focuses on Shinji's communication difficulties, rather than his battle with Shamshel. The assistant director of the series, Kazuya Tsurumaki, noticed that at the beginning of the episode Shinji talks to Misato without going into her room or them looking at each other, "Like they are looking through a slightly opened door, but not connecting". Tsurumaki also pointed out how the same "distant, awkward communication" can be observed between Shinji and Rei and Shinji and his father. Multiversity Comics' Matthew Garcia traced an influence on the episodes to Hideaki Anno's personal experience, particularly the production of his previous work, Nadia; according to him, like Anno on Nadia, Shinji is thrown "into a situation he didn't understand or have much investment in".

Shinji struggles to make friends and has a cold, laconic, reserved attitude in the episode; Ritsuko mentions the hedgehog's dilemma, a psychoanalytic term, to describe his behaviour. Like the hedgehogs of Arthur Schopenhauer's Parerga and Paralipomena, Shinji is afraid to be hurt and withdraws from human contact. Akio Satsukawa added the term while writing the script, and it would later become one of the show's main themes.

One of Shinji's classmates seen in "A Transfer" resembles Nadia Arwol, a character from Gainax's previous work, The Secret of Blue Water. The episode also mentions the date of the Second Impact, September 13, 2000, which is a tribute to the TV show Space 1999, in which an explosion of radioactive waste deposits on the Moon takes place on September 13, 1999, causing the satellite to change its orbit. Mecha anime of the 1960s inspired the battle against Shamshel; the Angel's design is also reminiscent of Alien Bira, an extraterrestrial species that appeared in the Ultraman franchise. Torii are also framed during the battle against Shamshel, which are also a reference to previous tokusatsu series.

Reception
"A Transfer" aired on October 18, 1995, and scored a 7.1% rating of audience share on Japanese TV. Official merchandise based on the episode has been released, including lighters and t-shirts.

The episode met with a divided reception. Screen Rant criticized Toji's aggression, as Comic Book Resources Ajay Aravind did; according to Aravind, his behavior "has no rhyme nor reason to it, making him a classic bully". Screen Rant Jack Cameron placed the battle against Shamshel among the lowest of Neon Genesis Evangelion fights, while Film School Rejects Max Covill criticized Shinji's actions, describing them as "frustrating". The Anime Café's reviewer Akio Nagatomi praised Shinji's manner to cope with the pressures of his pilot role and the glimpse into what the civilians go during the battles. He also praised animation, soundtrack and directing, but criticized Shinji's revelation of being a pilot to his classmates as "some socially-inept writer's attempt to live out some adolescent fantasy". Jane Nagatomi similarly criticized the episode as "too predictable". EX.org's Peter Cahill praised "the wanton destruction and desperate heroism" of the battle, also eulogizing the animation of "A Transfer" and "Hedgehog's Dilemma". Noah Black similarly praised the characters' development, as they have time to comprehend and begin to deal with the issues and duties forced upon them. Supanova Expo's official website ranked the scene in which Shinji rescues his classmates from Shamshel among the best moments of the character.

References 
  Text was copied/adapted from Episode 03 at Evageeks wiki, which is released under a Creative Commons Attribution-Share Alike 3.0 (Unported) (CC-BY-SA 3.0) license.

Citations

Bibliography

External links
 

1995 Japanese television episodes
Neon Genesis Evangelion episodes
Science fiction television episodes